Makundapur is a census town in Ganjam district in the Indian state of Odisha.

Demographics
 India census, Makundapur had a population of 4974. Males constitute 51% of the population and females 49%. Makundapur has an average literacy rate of 71%, higher than the national average of 59.5%: male literacy is 81%, and female literacy is 60%. In Makundapur, 12% of the population is under 6 years of age.

References

Cities and towns in Ganjam district